Gheorghe Mihăilescu (born 2 February 1888, unknown date of death) was a Romanian World War I pilot, credited with 4 victories by Romanian standards, but with a total of 8 victories, including shared ones.

Biography

Early life
Gheorghe Mihăilescu was born on 2 February 1888 in Alexandria, Teleorman County. He attended the Military School of Artillery, Engineering and Navy, receiving the rank of Sublocotenent (Slt.) on 1 July 1908. He attended the Piloting School of the National Air League, obtaining pilot license no.19 on 11 October 1913.

Military career
During the Second Balkan War, he flew with Section II of Aviation, commanded by Captain (Cpt.) George Valentin Bibescu, executing a number of missions.

Before the war, he also served as an instructor at the Băneasa Flight School, and on 1 July 1916, he was promoted to the rank of Lieutenant. 

On 22 January 1917, he scored his first victory over a German aircraft which crashed behind enemy lines over the front of the 2nd Romanian Army. On 21 June, while on a mission over Târgu Ocna, he shot down a Hansa-Brandenburg C.I of FliK 39 flown by Augustin Novak and Karl Lukats, the victory was shared with Sergeant (Sgt.) Nicolae Mănescu. He will shoot down Novak again, on 8 July, while on a mission with Cpt.  over Dărmănești. This time, Mihăilescu was the one who delivered the coup de grâce. During the battle, Novak's observer, Franz Fritos von Felsöbenced lost his life, the aircraft crashing near Bergy Magyaros.

On 9 August 1917, while escorting the Farman F.40 flown by French Sgt. de Triquerville and Slt. Dumitru Bădulescu, he engaged and shot down the Oeffag C.II no. 52.63 of FliK 31, flown by Zugsführer Adolf Rabel and observer Oberleutnant Franz Xaver Schlarbaum. The Austro-Hungarian aircraft crash-landed in no man's land, closer to the Romanian trenches, Schlarbaum being rescued from the wreck of the aircraft by Bădulescu and de Triquerville.

He would score his last non-shared victory over a German DFW on 21 August. On 7 September, he carried out 8 combat missions together with Ioan Georgescu and Paul Urechescu (who recently joined the squadron), totaling 11 hours of flight time. During these missions, the pilots of N.1 squadron engaged 5 Austro-Hungarian KD fighters.

Chambe, described him as such:

Air victories

Gheorghe Mihăilescu scored 8 victories during the war, 4 of which were shared with other pilots (thus not counted by Romanian standards):

Awards
He received the following awards:
 Order of the Star of Romania with Swords, Knight Class
 Order of Saint Anna 2nd Class
 Croix de Guerre

See also
 List of World War I flying aces from Romania

Notes

References

Romanian aviators
Aviation history of Romania
Romanian World War I pilots
1888 births
People from Alexandria, Romania
Year of death missing